Ballée is a former commune in the Mayenne department in northwestern France. On 1 January 2017, it was merged into the new commune Val-du-Maine.

Geography
The Vaige forms part of the commune's western border.

Population

See also
Communes of Mayenne

References

Former communes of Mayenne